Bernhard Hanssen may refer to:

 Cornelius Bernhard Hanssen (1864–1939), Norwegian teacher, shipowner and politician
 Bernhard Georg Hanssen (1844–1911), German architect and politician